The Yamaha FZ1 is a naked bike made by Yamaha Motor Company in Japan.

First generation (FZS1000 Fazer; 2001–2005) 

First generation models are known as the FZ1 in the United States and FZS1000 Fazer in Europe. They have tubular steel frames and modified YZF-R1 engines which are carbureted. The models were virtually unchanged over this period, except for colour options, the introduction of the FZS1000S which had a black engine, and in some European countries the 2005 models were fitted with rudimentary catalytic converters.

Second generation (FZ1 Fazer; 2006–2015)
In 2006, the bike got a completely different model, still known as FZ1 in USA. In Europe and other markets, it was known as FZ1-S Fazer, which is semi-faired alongside a naked (without fairing) version which was known as FZ1-N. The main changes included a new chassis, suspension, bodywork and a completely different engine. Cast aluminum diecast diamond-shaped frame with the engine as stressed member replaced the older tubular steel frame along with a control-filled die-cast swingarm. This brought the bike up to date with modern rivals. The new model has a 150 bhp  20-valve DOHC engine from the 2004–2006 YZF-R1 tuned for better midrange torque, set in an all-new compact diamond-shaped aluminium frame. Most of this engine is identical to the YZF-R1. The primary internal changes are a 40 percent heavier flywheel and revised balance shaft.  New camshafts with reduced lift and duration aim to boost performance at lower revs, and the gearbox's top two ratios are higher to give a more relaxed feel at cruising speeds. Modifications are as follows:

2006 
 Stiff rear spring with a 700 lb/in
 2006 version when first introduced had distinct throttle snatch at 5,000––6,000 rpm, where rolling off the throttle and rolling back on caused a distinct surge in acceleration due to 'fuel cut' for emissions reasons.

06 - 07 Prone to frame cracks in the welds.

2007 
 Softened rear shock spring.
 Updated fuel injection system. Throttle snatch reduced to normal by slowing secondary butterfly opening. This smoothed out the surge caused by 'fuel cut' and subsequent re-application of fuel.

2010 
 Revised ECU mapping to achieve improved throttle response in the low to mid rpm range.

2011 
 The ECU mapping revised for improved throttle response at low rpm.

2014–2015 
 The ECU mapping revised again for smoother mid range. 2014 and 2015 models are the same except for the color. 2015 is the last year for the FZ1 in the US. First in Europe, the naked FZ1-N and half-faired FZ1-S Fazer were replaced by the FZ-10/MT-10 of Yamaha's new ″Hyper Naked″ class, which is available with accessory touring pack.

2006-2014 models are known for rotor failure; the magnets delaminate which can cause catastrophic engine damage. Generally, owners replace the factory rotors with updated ones.

Specifications

Reviews 
The 2001 model received a good review from Motorcyclist Magazine

The 2001 model received a good review from Motorcycle-USA.com

The updated 2006 model received a good review from Motorcycle-USA.com

The 2006 model received a good review from Cycle World

FZ1 came second in a Rider Magazine Naked bike comparison

The 2009 model received an excellent review from Two Wheel Freaks

The 2008 model received an interesting review from Motorcycle Thailand

Building the Perfect Motorcycle

References

External links 

 Yamaha USA FZ1 Product Page
 Yamaha Europe FZ1 Product Page
 Yamaha Europe FZ1 Fazer Product Page
 

FZ1
Standard motorcycles